La Bezole is a commune in the Aude department in southern France.

Population

See also
Communes of the Aude department

References

External links

 Photos of La Bezole

Communes of Aude
Aude communes articles needing translation from French Wikipedia